"Zamanyly" is a song by Ukrainian singer Jamala and Ukrainian folk quartet DakhaBrakha. It was released as a digital download in Ukraine on 4 November 2016 by Enjoy! Records. The song has charted in Russia and Ukraine.

Track listing

Charts

Release history

References

2016 songs
2016 singles
Jamala songs